Howard Mackie (born January 22, 1958) is an American comic book editor and writer. He has worked almost exclusively for Marvel Comics and is best known as the co-creator of the Danny Ketch version of the Ghost Rider character.

Early life
Mackie grew up in Cypress Hills, Brooklyn, mostly raised by his mother, as his father had died when he was seven.

Career

Editor
Mackie started his career in comics in 1984 as an assistant editor for Mark Gruenwald. Early in Mackie's career, a running gag in Gruenwald's columns was that Mackie was a mysterious figure whose face no one at Marvel had ever seen. Promoted in early 1987 to Managing Editor of Special Projects, Mackie then oversaw Marvel's "New Universe" line.

Writer 

Mackie first gained attention as a writer in 1990, when he and artist Javier Saltares launched a new Ghost Rider series for Marvel, revamping the character and introducing a new host, Danny Ketch. Mackie wrote Ghost Rider until issue #69 (Jan. 1996). He authored two Ghost Rider/Wolverine/Punisher team-up one-shots, Hearts of Darkness (1991) and its sequel The Dark Design (1994).

In 1992, Mackie became the regular writer of Web of Spider-Man with #85. He would remain on various Spider-Man titles through the Clone Saga. In January 1999, Mackie became the writer of both The Amazing Spider-Man and the Peter Parker: Spider-Man series when those two titles were relaunched with new first issues. Mackie left the Spider-Man franchise with The Amazing Spider-Man vol. 2, #29 (May 2001).

Mackie's work on the X-Men line included writing the spin-off title X-Factor from #115–149 (1995–1998) as well as its successor title Mutant X (1998–2001). He wrote several mini-series featuring Gambit, Wolverine, and Rogue.

In late 2009, Mackie teamed with Tom DeFalco to write the six issue miniseries Spider-Man: Clone Saga, whose story was based on Mackie's original notes for the 1990s crossover. It was later collected in the trade paperback Spider-Man: The Real Clone Saga.

Mackie wrote The Ravagers series for DC Comics in 2012 as part of the "Second Wave" of The New 52.

Bibliography

DC Comics
 Batman Black and White vol. 2 #1 (2013)
 Ravagers #1–7, 0 (2012–2013)
 Speed Demon #1 (1996)

Marvel Comics

 Air Raiders #1–3 (1987–1988)
 The Amazing Spider-Man vol. 2 #1–29 (1999–2001)
 The Amazing Spider-Man 1999
 The Amazing Spider-Man 2000
 The Amazing Spider-Man 2001
 Astonishing X-Men #1–3 (1995)
 Avengers Spotlight #21–25, 27–29 (1989–1990)
 Blaze: Legacy of Blood #1–4 (1993–1994)
 The Brotherhood #1–9 (2001-2002), as Writer X
 Chuck Norris Karate Kommandos #4 (1987)
 D.P. 7 #21 (1988)
 Gambit #1–4 (1993–1994)
 Gambit vol. 2 #1–4 (1997)
 Ghost Rider vol. 3 #1–69, Annual #1 (1990–1996)
 Ghost Rider/Blaze:Spirits of Vengeance #1–23 (1992–1994)
 Ghost Rider/Wolverine/Punisher: Dark Design #1 (1995)
 Ghost Rider/Wolverine/Punisher: Hearts of Darkness #1 (1991)
 Ghost Riders: Crossroads #1 (1995)
 Impossible Man Summer Vacation Spectacular #1 (1990)
 Iron Man #211 (1986)
 Logan #1 (1996)
 Logan: Shadow Society #1 (1996)
 Marc Spector: Moon Knight #25, 32–33 (1991)
 Marvel Comics Presents #24–31, 64–71, 90–95, 97, 99–106, 117–122 (1989–1993)
 Marvel Holiday Special #1 (1992)
 Midnight Sons Unlimited #1 (1993)
 Mutant X #1–32 (1998–2001)
 Mutant X 2000
 Mutant X 2001
 Peter Parker: Spider-Man #1–19 (1999–2000)
 Power Pack #34 (1988)
 Powerline #8 (1989)
 Psi-Force #22 (1988)
 Rogue #1–4 (1995)
 Scarlet Spider #1–2 (1995)
 Sensational She-Hulk #50 (1993)
 Solo Avengers #12, 18–20 (1988–1989)
 The Spectacular Spider-Man #263 (1998)
 Spider-Man #24, 44–98, −1, (1992–1998)
 Spider-Man: Made Men #1 (1998)
 Tales of the Marvel Universe #1 (1997)
 Uncanny X-Men '96 #1
 Venom: Nights of Vengeance #1–4 (1994)
 Venom: Separation Anxiety #1–4 (1994–1995)
 Web of Spider-Man #84–96 (1992–1993)
 Webspinners: Tales of Spider-Man #13–14 (2000)
 What The--?! #6 (1990)
 X-Factor #115–149, −1 (1995–1998)
 X-Men Chronicles #1–2 (1995)
 X-Men Unlimited #7–8, 15 (1994–1997)

References

External links

Howard Mackie at Mike's Amazing World of Comics
Howard Mackie at the Unofficial Handbook of Marvel Comics Creators

1958 births
American comics writers
Comic book editors
Living people
Marvel Comics writers
Writers from Brooklyn